Paul Djolpa McKenzie is a musician and educator from Maningrida, Australia in the Arnhem Land.

McKenzie is a VET teacher at Maningrida Community Education Centre. In 2008 he got a Deadly Award for Outstanding Achievement in Aboriginal and Torres Strait Islander Education.

McKenzie fronts Wild Water, a band which plays a mix of reggae, rock, dub and funk. He sing in Brarra, Kriol and English. Wild Water has toured nationally And released two albums, Baltpa (1996) and Rrawa (2007).

McKenzie was a part of The Black Arm Band, performing in their Hidden Republic and dirtsong shows.

References

Indigenous Australian musicians
Australian male singers
Living people
Year of birth missing (living people)